Caltex Records is a record label based in Los Angeles, California. It was founded in 1980 by Iranian American immigrant Mehrdad Pakravan. The label focuses on Iranian music. In 1994, the label represented 75% of Persian musical artists in the world in part due to the exodus of musicians from Iran after the government banned popular music.

Notable artists
Artists and bands who have recorded with Caltex Records include:

 Andranik Madadian
 Andy & Kouros
 Aref Arefkia
 Artashes Avetyan 
 Bijan Mortazavi
 Black Cats
 Dariush Eghbali
 Delkash
 Ebi
 Faramarz Aslani
 Fereydoun Farrokhzad
 Gholam-Hossein Banan
 Googoosh
 Hassan Sattar
 Hayedeh
 Homeyra
 Kourosh Yaghmaei
 Leila Forouhar
 Mahasti
 Mansour
 Marzieh
 Moein
 Morteza Barjesteh
 Pyruz
 Shahram Shabpareh
 Shahrum Kashani
 Shakila
 Shohreh Solati
 Siavash Ghomayshi
 Siavash Shams
 Susan Roshan
 Viguen

See also
 List of record labels

References

American record labels
Persian music
Persian pop music
Iranian record labels
Record labels based in California
Record labels established in 1980